Get Scared was an American post-hardcore band from Layton, Utah, United States, formed in 2008. After their formation they released their first EP Cheap Tricks and Theatrics in 2009. A self-titled EP followed several months later in 2010. The band's debut studio album, Best Kind of Mess, was released on July 12, 2011. Following Nicholas Matthews' first departure to join Blacklisted Me, the band released Cheap Tricks and Theatrics B-Sides on December 19, 2011, without any previous announcements. Matthews was replaced by Joel Faviere near the end of 2011. The band's third EP and first with Faviere, Built for Blame, Laced With Shame, was released in 2012; Faviere was kicked out a few months after the EP's release when Matthews rejoined the band. Following Matthews' comeback, the band signed with Fearless Records and released their second full-length album, Everyone's Out To Get Me, on November 11, 2013. The band's third studio album, Demons, was released on October 30, 2015, and marked a departure from the band's post-hardcore sound featured on Built for Blame and Everyone's Out to Get Me in favor of a more metalcore-like sound. Their fourth and final album, The Dead Days, was released on April 19, 2019 amidst a hiatus; it was later stated by vocalist Nicholas Matthews that the band had broken up due to multiple issues between the band members. Though the band announced a reunion in 2022, plans ultimately fell through.

History

Early years, Best Kind of Mess and Built for Blame, Laced With Shame (2008–2013)
Before forming the band, Nicholas Matthews, Johnny Braddock, Bradley Iverson and Warren Wilcock were all in separate bands. The four came together to form the band and self-released their first EP, Cheap Tricks and Theatrics.

During summer 2010, the band went on Hot Topic's Sacred Ceremony tour with Black Veil Brides and Vampires Everywhere!, helping promote the band's music. The band then embarked on several tours, notably the first leg of The Dead Masquerade Tour (with Escape the Fate, Alesana, Drive A and Motionless in White) from January to March 2011 and an Aiden headliner including Eyes Set To Kill, Dr. Acula, Vampires Everywhere!, and Escape the Fate (only certain dates) in the spring of 2011. On July 12, 2011, they released their debut full-length album Best Kind of Mess, their first release through Universal Motown Records featuring mastered remakes of the songs "Setting Yourself Up for Sarcasm" and "If She Only Knew Voodoo Like I Do" with the shortened names "Sarcasm" and "Voodoo". The band embarked on the Fuck You All Tour with Dr. Acula and Girl On Fire  in support of the album.

On November 30, 2011, the band announced that Matthews was leaving the band. They stated that Matthews wanted to pursue more options in his musical career with Blacklisted Me and that it was a surprise to the entire band. The band postponed any touring dates until further notice due to the sudden departure and lack of a lead vocalist. In the same message, they also announced that they would be holding auditions for lead vocalist.

The band re-entered the studio with the new lead vocalist on December 28. Although it was not officially announced who the new vocalist was, at the time there was much speculation that former Dear Chandelier singer Joel Faviere replaced Matthews, due to the tweets sent by Faviere and some of the members of Get Scared on Twitter. It was later made official that Faviere was the new lead vocalist. The team also welcomed new guitarist Adam Virostko to the band that following September 2012 to play The Pizza Party Tour with Dead Rabbits. Virostko became a permanent member that fall being formally announced on November 21, 2012. Faviere was the singer of the band for a short time until the return of Matthews on November 19, 2012. Only one EP, Built for Blame, Laced With Shame, was released during Faviere's tenure with the band. Faviere was arrested for 4,500 counts of child pornography in 2017.

Everyone's Out To Get Me (2013–2014)
On June 5, 2013, Get Scared announced their signing with Fearless Records and confirmed that their second studio album was coming later in the year. On June 21, they released a new song entitled, "At My Worst" on YouTube. Another song leaked on Twitter before any announcement had been made about a new album and was titled, "For You"; initially thought to be lost, it was revealed months later that it will appear on the new album.

On September 18, the band announced that their second studio album would be titled Everyone's Out To Get Me, and it would be released on November 11 via Fearless. Along with the announcement, they revealed the track list and also released a short preview of a new song, "Told Ya So". The full song was released on September 24.

On January 1, 2014, Fearless Records released a video on their page on YouTube announcing bands that will be releasing albums in 2014; they announced in the video that Get Scared would appear on the compilation Punk Goes 90s Vol. 2 with their cover of Lit's "My Own Worst Enemy".

Demons, The Dead Days and break-up (2015–2019)
The band announced their third studio album, Demons on September 3, 2015 along with the release of lead single "Buried Alive". A second single, titled "Suffer" was released on October 2. On October 22, a third single, "R.I.P." was released on iTunes and the new Apple Music. The album was officially released on October 30, 2015. To promote the album the band embarked on New Years Day's The Other Side Tour and all but three dates of I See Stars' Light In The Cave Tour in October 2015 and February 2016, respectively. The band also had a short headlining tour in Mexico and performances at Scream Out Festival in Japan and the South By So What Festival in Texas to support the album.

The band entered the studio in November 2017 with producer Kris Crummett to record their fourth studio album. The album had a tentative release date of 2018, but it did not come to pass. On January 9, 2019, guitarist Johnny Braddock announced the band was on a hiatus as vocalist Nicholas Matthews recovers from a heroin addiction. Several days later, Matthews announced he had left the band.

On April 10, 2019, Johnny Braddock announced The Dead Days would be released on April 19, 2019. On September 15, 2019, Nicholas Matthews posted an explanation video; after someone asked in the comments if the band had broken up, Matthews stated "unfortunately that is correct". He then went on to state:

Reunion attempt and definitive breakup (2022)
On April 1st, 2022, the band made a post on their official Facebook and YouTube pages, hinting to a reunion.  

A few months after this, on October 21st, 2022, Matthews posted this to his Instagram page, hinting at Get Scared's final end.

Controversy 
On February 15, 2017, the band's former lead singer Joel Faviere was arrested on child pornography charges during an undercover sting. The band released a statement stating "his time in the band was very short, [but] we feel he has tarnished the very name we worked so hard to build up for the past 9 years" and apologizing "to those of you who have been hurt or affected by this man’s actions." They also encouraged people to donate to the National Center for Missing and Exploited Children.

On May 11, 2018, Faviere was sentenced to 12 years in prison for the child pornography charges. He is currently held at South Bay Correctional Facility.

Members

Final line-up
 Nicholas Matthews – lead vocals (2008–2011, 2012–2019)
 Johnny Braddock  – lead guitar, backing vocals (2008–2019), bass (2008–2012)
 Bradley "Lloyd" Iverson – bass, backing vocals (2008–2019), rhythm guitar (2008–2012)
 Dan Juarez – drums, percussion (2009–2019)
 Adam Virostko – rhythm guitar (2012–2019)

Former members
 Warren Wilcock – drums, percussion (2008)
 Joel Faviere – lead vocals (2011–2012)

Touring musicians
 Logan V – bass (2009)
 TJ Bell – bass (2011–2012)

Timeline

Discography 
Studio albums
Best Kind of Mess (2011)
Everyone's Out to Get Me (2013)
Demons (2015)
The Dead Days (2019)

EPs
Cheap Tricks and Theatrics (2009)
Get Scared (2010)
Cheap Tricks and Theatrics: B-Sides (2011)
Built for Blame, Laced with Shame (2012)

Singles
"Sarcasm" (2011)
"Fail" (2011)
"Whore" (2011)
"Cynical Skin" (2012)
"Built for Blame" (2012)
"Don't You Dare Forget the Sun" (2012)
"At My Worst" (2013)
"Told Ya So" (2013)
"Badly Broken" (2013)
"My Own Worst Enemy" (2014)
"Buried Alive" (2015)
"Suffer" (2015)
"R.I.P" (2015)

Music videos
"If Only She Knew Voodoo Like I Do" (2009)
"Sarcasm" (2011)
"Don't You Dare Forget The Sun" (2012)
"Badly Broken" (2013)
"Buried Alive" (2015)
"Suffer" (2015)
"R.I.P" (2016)

See also

 List of alternative rock artists
 List of gothic rock bands
 List of post-hardcore bands
 List of Utah musical groups
 Music of Utah

References

External links
 

2008 establishments in Utah
21st-century American musicians
Alternative rock groups from Utah
American gothic rock groups
American post-hardcore musical groups
Musical groups established in 2008
Musical groups disestablished in 2019
Musical groups reestablished in 2022
Musical quintets
Fearless Records artists
Motown artists
Universal Motown Records artists
Metalcore musical groups from Utah